Anna A. Lysyanskaya is an American cryptographer known for her research on digital signatures and anonymous digital credentials. She is a professor of computer science at Brown University.

Early life and education
Lysyanskaya grew up in Kyiv, Ukraine,
and came to the US in 1993 to attend Smith College, where she graduated in 1997. She went to the Massachusetts Institute of Technology for graduate study, earning a master's degree in 1999 and completing her Ph.D. in 2002. Her dissertation, Signature Schemes and Applications to Cryptographic Protocol Design, was supervised by Ron Rivest.

Career
After completing her doctorate, Lysyanskaya joined the Brown University faculty in 2002.

She is a member of the board of directors of the International Association for Cryptologic Research, first elected in 2012, and re-elected for two additional three-year terms in 2015 and 2018. She served on the Scientific Advisory Board for the Institute for Computational and Experimental Research in Mathematics (ICERM) through 2021.

See also
Signatures with efficient protocols

References

External links
Home page

Year of birth missing (living people)
Living people
Scientists from Kyiv
Ukrainian emigrants to the United States
American computer scientists
American cryptographers
Ukrainian women computer scientists
Ukrainian cryptographers
Public-key cryptographers
Smith College alumni
Massachusetts Institute of Technology alumni
Brown University faculty
Women cryptographers
American women computer scientists
21st-century Ukrainian women scientists
21st-century American women scientists